Structural Marxism is an approach to Marxist philosophy based on structuralism, primarily associated with the work of the French philosopher Louis Althusser and his students. It was influential in France during the 1960s and 1970s, and also came to influence philosophers, political theorists and sociologists outside France during the 1970s. Other proponents of structural Marxism were the sociologist Nicos Poulantzas and the anthropologist Maurice Godelier. Many of Althusser's students broke with structural Marxism in the late 1960s and 1970s.

Overview
Structural Marxism arose in opposition to the instrumental Marxism that dominated many western universities during the 1970s. In contrast to other forms of Marxism, Althusser stressed that Marxism was a science that examined objective structures, and he believed that historicist and phenomenological Marxism, which was based on Marx's early works, was caught in a "pre-scientific ideology".

Toward the middle of the 1970s and throughout the 1980s, Marxist theorists began to develop structuralist Marxist accounts of the state, law, and crime. Structuralist Marxism disputes the instrumentalist view that the state can be viewed as the direct servant of the capitalist or ruling class. Whereas the instrumentalist position is that the institutions of the state are under the direct control of those members of the capitalist class in positions of state power, the structuralist position is that state institutions must function so as to ensure the viability of capitalism more generally. In other words, state institutions must reproduce capitalist society as a whole. The debate between structural and instrumental Marxists was characterized by the Miliband–Poulantzas debate between instrumentalist Ralph Miliband and structuralist Nicos Poulantzas.

Structuralists view the state in a capitalist mode of production as taking a specifically capitalist form, not because particular individuals are in powerful positions, but because the state reproduces the logic of capitalist structure in its economic, legal, and political institutions. Hence, from a structuralist perspective one would argue that state institutions (including legal ones) function in the long-term interests of capital and capitalism, rather than in the short-term interests of members of the capitalist class. Thus the state and its institutions have a certain degree of independence from specific elites in the ruling or capitalist class.

Long- versus short-term class interests
Structural Marxism posits that the state functions to serve the long-term interests of the Bourgeosie. Building upon the works of Engels, structural Marxists posit that the state is a mechanism for regulating class conflict, the irreconcilable tension between the proletariat and the bourgeoisie. By regulating these antagonisms rather than eliminating them which is thought impossible without violent revolution—the state serves to stabilize the capitalist system as a whole and preserve its existence.

Structuralists differentiate between the long-term and short-term interests of the capitalist class in order to describe the necessity of the state to the capitalist system. Short-term interests of the bourgeoisie include policies that affect capital accumulation in the immediate future such as tax breaks, reduced minimum wages, government subsidies, etc. They maintain that when the state does not benefit the bourgeois class' short-term interests, it is acting on the behalf of its future interests. Accordingly, when the state seems to act on behalf of the proletariat rather than the bourgeoisie (raising minimum wage, increasing labor rights, etc.) it is serving capitalist interests by meeting the demands of workers only enough to prevent an uprising that could threaten the system as a whole. Because the interests of the proletariat and the capitalist classes are counter to one another, the state is necessary to regulate the capitalist system and assure its preservation by forcing capitalists to agree to demands of workers to which they otherwise would not succumb.

Criticism

Similar arguments have been made concerning structural theories of the capitalist nature of the state. Claus Offe averred that the class-character of the state could only be observed in an ex post perspective. In other words, the class character of the state can only be shown after policies are put in place and the outcome is observed. Because of this, he criticizes structural theories which attempt to prove the capitalist character of the state, claiming they do so on an unfounded basis: because outcomes of the state's policies are empirically capitalist, it does not make the State a capitalist enterprise in its nature.

References

Eponymous political ideologies
Marxist schools of thought
Neo-Marxism
Social theories
Structuralism